Barbituric acid or malonylurea or 6-hydroxyuracil is an organic compound based on a pyrimidine heterocyclic skeleton. It is an odorless powder soluble in water. Barbituric acid is the parent compound of barbiturate drugs, although barbituric acid itself is not pharmacologically active. The compound was first synthesised by Adolf von Baeyer.

Naming
It remains unclear why Baeyer chose to name the compound that he discovered "barbituric acid". In his textbook Organic Chemistry, the American organic chemist Louis Frederick Fieser (1899–1977) initially speculated that the name stemmed from the German word Schlüsselbart (literally, the beard (Bart''' Latin: barba) of a key (Schlüssel)' that is, the bit of a key), because Baeyer had regarded barbituric acid as central (or "key") to understanding  uric acid and its derivatives. However, Fieser subsequently decided that Baeyer had named the compound after a young lady whom he had met and who was called "Barbara"' hence the name "barbituric acid" was a combination of the name "Barbara" and "uric acid".Fiesler, L. F., Organic Chemistry (Boston, Massachusetts: D.C. Heath and Company, 1944), p. 247. Other sources claim that Baeyer named the compound after Saint Barbara, either because he discovered it on the feast day of St. Barbara (December 4) or because he sometimes lunched with artillery officers and St. Barbara is their patron saint.Alex Nickon, Ernest F. Silversmith, Organic Chemistry: The Name Game: Modern Coined Terms and Their Origins (New York, New York: Pergamon Press, 1987), pp. 133–134.

Synthesis
Barbituric acid was first prepared and named in 1864 by the German chemist Adolf von Baeyer, by reducing what Baeyer called Alloxanbromid'' (alloxan dibromide, now: 5,5-dibromobarbituric acid) with hydrocyanic acid, and later by reducing dibromobarbituric acid with a combination of sodium amalgam and hydrogen iodide. In 1879, the French chemist Édouard Grimaux synthesized barbituric acid from malonic acid, urea, and phosphorus oxychloride (POCl3). Malonic acid has since been replaced by diethyl malonate, because using the ester avoids the problem of having to deal with the acidity of the carboxylic acid and its unreactive carboxylate.

Properties
The α-carbon has a reactive hydrogen atom and is quite acidic (pKa = 4.01) even for a diketone species (cf. dimedone with pKa 5.23 and acetylacetone with pKa 8.95) because of the additional aromatic stabilization of the carbanion.

Uses
Using the Knoevenagel condensation reaction, barbituric acid can form a large variety of barbiturate drugs that behave as central nervous system depressants. As of 2007, more than 2550 barbiturates and related compounds have been synthesised, with 50 to 55 in clinical use around the world at present. The first to be used in medicine was barbital (Veronal) starting in 1903, and the second, phenobarbital was first marketed in 1912.

Barbituric acid is a chemical building block in the laboratory synthesis of riboflavin (vitamin B2) and in a method of producing the pharmaceutical drug minoxidil. It is one of the four ingredients in the synthesis of riboflavin. Before barbituric acid was substituted in the synthesis of riboflavin, it was too expensive to synthesize riboflavin. According to Taber's Cyclopedic Medical Dictionary, overdoses cause respiratory depression, cyanosis, circulatory collapse, stupor, coma, and possibly death.

Health and safety
Overdose of barbiturate drugs can cause respiratory depression and death. Barbiturates are dependence-producing, and abrupt cessation of high doses can result in a very medically serious, even lethal, withdrawal syndrome.    Barbituric acid derivatives are considered DEA Schedule III controlled substances.

See also
Barbiturase
Thiobarbituric acid
Isocyanuric acid

References

External links

Barbiturates
Pyrimidines
1864 in science